The 1901 Chicago Maroons football team was an American football team that represented the University of Chicago during the 1901 Western Conference football season.  In their 10th season under head coach Amos Alonzo Stagg, the Maroons compiled an 8–6–2 record, finished in eighth place in the Western Conference with a 0–4–1 record against conference opponents, and outscored all opponents by a combined total of 175 to 131.

Schedule

Roster

Head coach: Amos Alonzo Stagg (10th year at Chicago)

References

Chicago
Chicago Maroons football seasons
Chicago Maroons football